Mothurapur is a village and union parishad of Chatmohar Upazila, Pabna, Bangladesh.

See also
Villages of Bangladesh
Unions of Bangladesh
Upazilas of Bangladesh
Districts of Bangladesh
Divisions of Bangladesh

References

Unions of Chatmohar Upazila